Pierre Auguste Martial Rhéaume (9 April 1882 – 17 December 1970) was a Liberal member of the House of Commons of Canada. He was a butcher and meat cutter by trade.

Rhéaume was a municipal councillor in Saint-Jean-sur-Richelieu, Quebec for 16 years, and the community's mayor for five years.

He was first elected to Parliament at the St. Johns—Iberville riding in the 1930 federal election. He campaigned unsuccessfully as an Independent Liberal candidate in 1926. Rhéaume was re-elected to Parliament in 1935 when his riding became known as St. Johns—Iberville—Napierville. After another re-election there in 1940, Rhéaume did not seek re-election in 1945. As the riding became known as Saint-Jean—Iberville—Napierville, Rhéaume's Parliamentary comeback bid as an independent candidate was unsuccessful in the 1949 election, as Alcide Côté of the Liberal party was re-elected in that riding.

References

External links
 

1882 births
1970 deaths
Liberal Party of Canada MPs
Mayors of places in Quebec
Members of the House of Commons of Canada from Quebec
Quebec municipal councillors
French Quebecers